Clyne or Clynes is an Irish and Scottish surname. Notable people with the surname include:

Clyne
Alan Clyne, (born 1986), Scottish squash player
Anna Clyne (born 1980), British-born composer
Cameron Clyne (born 1968), Australian businessman
Daniel Clyne (1879–1965), Australian politician
David Clyne (1916–1944), Scottish footballer
Densey Clyne (1922–2019), Australian naturalist
Jeff Clyne (1937–2009), British jazz bassist
John Clyne (1902–1989), Canadian lawyer
Meghan Clyne, American writer
Michael Clyne (1939–2010), Australian linguist
Nathaniel Clyne (born 1991), English footballer
Nicki Clyne (born 1983), Canadian actress
Paul Clyne, District Attorney, Albany County, New York
Peter Clyne (1927–1987), Australian lawyer and tax consultant
Roger Clyne (born 1968), American rock singer. Also in Roger Clyne and the Peacemakers
Ronald Clyne (1925–2006), American designer and graphic artist
Sam Hidalgo-Clyne (born 1993), Scottish rugby union player.

Clynes
Daniela Clynes, British vocalist, jazz and cabaret singer
John Robert Clynes (1869–1949), also known as J. R. Clynes, British politician
Manfred Clynes (1925–2020), Austrian/Australian scientist, inventor, and musician
Michael Clynes (born 1946), pseudonym of Paul C. Doherty, British author, educator, lecturer and historian
Nelly Clynes, or Nechama Ben-Or (born 1933), Polish Jewish concert pianist 

English-language surnames
Scottish surnames
Surnames of Irish origin
Anglicised Irish-language surnames